Summit is a town in Roberts County, South Dakota, United States. The population was 288 at the 2020 census.

History
Summit was laid out in 1892, and was so named on account of the town site's lofty elevation.

Geography
Summit is located at  (45.303743, -97.037106).

Summit has been assigned the ZIP code 57266 and the FIPS place code 62220.

Climate

Demographics

2010 census
As of the census of 2010, there were 288 people, 112 households, and 69 families residing in the town. The racial makeup of the town was 63.5% White, 0.3% African American, 29.2% Native American, 0.3% Asian, and 6.6% from two or more races. Hispanic or Latino of any race were 1.0% of the population.

There were 112 households, of which 42.9% had children under the age of 18 living with them, 40.2% were married couples living together, 10.7% had a female householder with no husband present, 10.7% had a male householder with no wife present, and 38.4% were non-families. 33.0% of all households were made up of individuals, and 9% had someone living alone who was 65 years of age or older. The average household size was 2.57 and the average family size was 3.32.

The median age in the town was 32.5 years. 35.4% of residents were under the age of 18; 6.6% were between the ages of 18 and 24; 25% were from 25 to 44; 23.3% were from 45 to 64; and 9.7% were 65 years of age or older. The gender makeup of the town was 53.1% male and 46.9% female.

2000 census
As of the census of 2000, there were 281 people, 119 households, and 74 families residing in the town. The population density was 747.2 people per square mile (285.5/km2). There were 144 housing units at an average density of 382.9 per square mile (146.3/km2). The racial makeup of the town was 83.63% White, 14.23% Native American, and 2.14% from two or more races.

There were 119 households, out of which 31.1% had children under the age of 18 living with them, 44.5% were married couples living together, 13.4% had a female householder with no husband present, and 37.0% were non-families. 31.9% of all households were made up of individuals, and 16.8% had someone living alone who was 65 years of age or older. The average household size was 2.36 and the average family size was 3.01.

In the town, the population was spread out, with 30.6% under the age of 18, 6.8% from 18 to 24, 24.6% from 25 to 44, 18.5% from 45 to 64, and 19.6% who were 65 years of age or older. The median age was 36 years. For every 100 females, there were 97.9 males. For every 100 females age 18 and over, there were 91.2 males.

The median income for a household in the town was $18,875, and the median income for a family was $23,125. Males had a median income of $28,750 versus $17,750 for females. The per capita income for the town was $9,339. About 28.2% of families and 34.9% of the population were below the poverty line, including 37.9% of those under the age of eighteen and 50.9% of those 65 or over.

Religion
Saint John's Lutheran Church is a Christian church of the Wisconsin Evangelical Lutheran Synod in Summit.

References

External links
 

Towns in Roberts County, South Dakota
Towns in South Dakota
Populated places established in 1897